The Swaziland Federation of Labour (SFL) was created in 1994 as a break-away union from the Swaziland Federation of Trade Unions. It has 12 affiliates covering manufacturing, retail, finance, IT, media and non-teaching staff, amongst other things. Originally 5,000 strong, the membership of the organisation has increased to 20,000. The federation has no full-time officials and relies on the full-time officers in its affiliated unions. The SFL also operates from affiliated unions' offices and has little finance of its own.

Key People 

 Vincent Ncongwane

References 

Trade unions in Eswatini
Trade unions established in 1994
1994 establishments in Swaziland